"No One's Gone" is the eighth episode and mid-season finale of the fourth season of the post-apocalyptic horror television series Fear the Walking Dead, which aired on AMC on June 10, 2018 in the United States.

Plot 
Sometime after the destruction of the Gonzalez Dam, Madison meets Althea, whom she tries to rob without success. Madison eventually gives her a story from when her children were little and explains how she is trying to protect their innocence. Upon their departure, Althea gives Madison food, a radio, and a map, allowing her to find her children. Althea's kindness inspires Madison to form the stadium community, but Althea never learns Madison's name. In the present, Naomi and Morgan struggle to get supplies to save John's life while Althea and Charlie deal with an attack from Alicia's group. The subsequent revelation that Althea met Madison and Morgan's intervention convinces Alicia to stop her path of vengeance. At night, Alicia's group finishes telling their story about the fall of the stadium, including how everyone else died when they tried to flee and were overrun. Madison is revealed to have led the Infected into the stadium to contain the herd and give her children, Strand, and Luciana a chance to survive. Madison ultimately sets the herd ablaze within the stadium, sacrificing herself to save the others. In honor of Madison's memory, Althea names the story after her and the group shares the same noodles she gave to Madison when they first met.

Reception 
"No One's Gone" received mixed reviews from critics, with Madison’s death receiving criticism. On Rotten Tomatoes, "No One's Gone" garnered a 67% rating, with an average score of 8.0/10 based on 9 reviews.

Ratings 
The episode was seen by 2.32 million viewers in the United States on its original air date, above the previous episodes ratings of 1.97 million viewers.

References

2018 American television episodes
Fear the Walking Dead (season 4) episodes